Aerial acrobatics may refer to:
 Aerobatics, the practice of flying maneuvers involving aircraft
 Acrobatics aided by an apparatus such as a trapeze, aerial silk, aerial hoop, rope, or corde lisse